The 1967 NCAA University Division Outdoor Track and Field Championships were contested June 15−17 at the 45th annual NCAA-sanctioned track meet to determine the individual and team national champions of men's collegiate University Division outdoor track and field events in the United States.

This year's outdoor meet was hosted by Brigham Young University at Cougar Stadium in Provo, Utah. (The track was removed from the stadium in 1982.)

The USC Trojans of the AAWU (Pacific-8 Conference) finished first in the team standings, capturing their twenty-fourth national title, followed by conference rivals Oregon and UCLA.

Team result 
 Note: Top 10 only
 (H) = Hosts

References

NCAA Men's Outdoor Track and Field Championship
NCAA University Division Track and Field Championships
NCAA
NCAA University Division Track and Field Championships